Brian Dettmer (born 1974) is an American contemporary artist. He is noted for his alteration of preexisting media—such as old books, maps, record albums, and cassette tapes—to create new, transformed works of visual fine art.

Life and art

Dettmer was born and raised in Naperville, Illinois in 1974. Until 2006, he lived in and around Chicago, where he earned a BA in fine arts from Columbia College Chicago in 1997. During school and following graduation, Dettmer worked as an artist and in positions related to graphics and signage design. In 2006, Dettmer moved with his wife to Atlanta, where he worked as a studio artist. (Brown 2008; Camper 2005). In 2013, Dettmer and his family relocated to New York City, where he continues his work today.

Early work

As a student, Dettmer focused primarily on painting. When he began to work in a sign shop, his work began to explore the relationship between text, images, language, and codes, including paintings based on braille, Morse Code, and American Sign Language. He then began to make work by repeatedly pasting newspapers and book pages to canvas and tearing off pieces, leaving behind layered fragments. (Sasaki 2009; Brown 2008; Camper 2005). In 2000, Dettmer started to experiment by gluing and cutting into books, the medium for which he is now best known. (Brown 2008).

Recent work

Dettmer's current work involves the appropriation and alteration of media to transform the physical form and/or to selectively remove and reveal content to create new works of fine art. Dettmer explains: "Old books, records, tapes, maps, and other media frequently fall into a realm that too much of today's art occupies. Their intended role has decreased or deceased and they often exist simply as symbols of the ideas they represent rather than true conveyors of content. … When an object's intended function is fleeting, the necessity for a new approach to its form and content arises." (Valdez 2006).

A large body of Dettmer's current work is created by altering books, including older dictionaries, encyclopedias, textbooks, science and engineering books, art books, medical guides, history books, atlases, comic books, wallpaper sample books, and others. Dettmer seals and cuts into the books, exposing select images and text to create intricate three-dimensional derivative works that reveal new or alternative interpretations of the books. Dettmer never inserts or moves any of the books' contents. (Moayeri 2008). This process is performed without pre-planning or mapping out the contents before cutting into the book. (Cullum 2010). As he cuts away unwanted material with knives, tweezers and surgical tools, Dettmer stabilizes the remaining paper with a varnish. (Fox 2009). An early example of Dettmer's altered books is his 2003 work, New International Dictionary, an original 1947 unabridged dictionary sealed and cut to expose images within the dictionary (Sundell 2005, at pg. 70).

Dettmer has subsequently augmented his process by folding, bending, rolling, or stacking one or more books before sealing and cutting them or, in some instances, sanding them to create a variety of forms. Dettmer has also constructed larger sculptures using complete sets of encyclopedias and other reference books. 

Other notable examples of media transformed by Dettmer include music cassette tapes melted and formed into a life-sized human skeleton (Tyson 2007) and various animal skulls; cut and layered highway maps of the United States and the Middle East (Packer 2005) and three-dimensional map sculptures; VHS videotapes of gangster movies unraveled and formed into funeral flower arrangements; and a controversial reconfiguration of audio excerpts from George W. Bush's 2002 State of the Union Address. (Feigly 2003).

Brian Dettmer's work has been published and exhibited widely in museums, art centers, and galleries around the world, including the Smithsonian (Washington D.C.), Museum of Arts and Design (New York), Virginia Museum of Contemporary Art (Virginia), Museum of Contemporary Art (Georgia), Museum Rijswijh (Netherlands), Wellcome Collection (United Kingdom), the Bellevue Arts Museum (Washington), The Kohler Arts Center (Wisconsin), and the Illinois State Museums (Illinois). His work can be found in public and private collections in the United States, Latin America, Europe, Australia, and Asia.

References
 "Artist of the Week, Brian Dettmer" (interview), what to wear during an orange alert?, November 21, 2007. Retrieved February 21, 2008.
 "Brian Dettmer, Altered State of the Art" (video interview), Gestalten.tv, March 4, 2009. Retrieved March 4, 2009.
 "Brian Dettmer Bio", Kinz + Tillou Fine Art. Retrieved December 5, 2008.
 Brown, Ellen Firsching. "The Cut-up Artist", Fine Books & Collections, No. 33, May/June 2008.
 Cain, Amina. "The Inner Light, Brian Dettmer: Visual Art 'DJ'", CAC Newspaper, June 2006.
 Camper, Fred. "Reading is Incidental", Chicago Reader, December 23, 2005. Section 2, pg. 24. Retrieved April 15, 2007.
 Cullum, Jerry. "Review: Brian Dettmer digs deep in altered books at Saltworks", ArtscriticATL.com, December 19, 2010. Retrieved January 4, 2011.
 Essmaker, Tina. "Brian Dettmer", The Great Discontent, July 31, 2012.
 Feaster, Felicia. "Speakeasy with Brian Dettmer" (interview), Creative Loafing, February 6, 2008. Retrieved February 8, 2008.
 Feigly, Amy. "Politics as Usual", IslamOnline.net, August 30, 2003. Retrieved March 19, 2007.
 Fox, Catherine. "Atlanta artist digs old books", The Atlanta Journal-Constitution, July 3, 2009. Retrieved July 3, 2009.
 Moayeri, Lily. "Brian Dettmer", BPM Magazine, July 8, 2008. Retrieved July 20, 2008.
 Outside The Artist's Studio Podcast Episode Twenty, October 30, 2008. Retrieved October 30, 2008.
 Packer, Aron. "Brian Dettmer: Altered States (explorations in media modification)", Packer Schopf Gallery, December 2005. Retrieved August 7, 2012.
 Raymunt, Monica. "From Trash to Treasure: Turning Discarded Books Into Art", The Atlantic, October 27, 2010. Retrieved October 29, 2010.
 
 Sasaki, Arata. "Interview with Brian Dettmer", HITSPAPER, 2009. Retrieved on July 8, 2009.
 Tyson, Josh. "Spine Surgery, Brian Dettmer's dissected books morph into sculptures", Time Out Chicago, Issue 109: March 29 – April 4, 2007. Retrieved on March 29, 2007.
 Valdez, Michelle Gonzalez. "Review: Unit B (Gallery)", Glasstire, May 2006. Retrieved September 7, 2008.

Further reading

 Baker, Kenneth. "Brian Dettmer turns books into sculptural pieces," San Francisco Chronicle, September 12, 2009, pg. E-2. Retrieved September 14, 2009.
 Feaster, Felicia. "Book Smarts," The Atlantan, December 2008, pp. 44–46.
 Kellogg, Carolyn. "Brian Dettmer's book art," Los Angeles Times (Jacket Copy, Book News and Information), October 31, 2008. Retrieved November 5, 2008.
 Landow, George. "Hors Livre," Modern Painters, November 2008. Retrieved November 7, 2008.
 Leaverton, Michael. "Digging Into a Good Book," San Francisco Weekly, July 4, 2007. Retrieved May 1, 2015.
 Lee-Tullis, James. "Book Extracts," Plantinum, American Express, ___ 2009.
 Loerzel, Robert. "Artistic surgeries create unusual work," Chicago News-Star, February 21, 2007. Retrieved March 19, 2007.
 Onion, Rebecca. "How Two Artists Turn Old Encyclopedias Into Beautiful, Melancholy Art", Salon.com, June 1, 2016.
 Packer, Aron. "Brian Dettmer: Book Work, Dissections and Excavations", Packer-Schopf Gallery, November 2003. Retrieved August 7, 2012.
 Pocock, Antonia. "Brian Dettmer: Adaptations," Packer-Schopf Gallery, April 2009. Retrieved April 2, 2009.
 Wolf, Alana. "Brian Dettmer: Are books dead?", BurnAway, June 3, 2010. Retrieved May 1, 2015.
 Brian Dettmer, Bibliography Retrieved May 1, 2015.

External links 
 
 Brian Dettmer's Flickr gallery
 

1974 births
Living people
Book artists
American contemporary artists
Columbia College Chicago alumni
Artists from Chicago